Choi Jong-hoon (born March 7, 1990) is a former South Korean musician and actor. He served as the leader, guitarist, and keyboardist of rock band F.T. Island from its debut in 2007 until his retirement from the entertainment industry in 2019.

On March 14, 2019, Choi retired from the entertainment industry, amidst allegations of being involved in bribery and sharing of illicit sex videos and pictures, a part of the Jung Joon-young KakaoTalk chatrooms, first revealed in the Burning Sun scandal. On November 29, 2019, Choi was found guilty and sentenced to five years in prison.

Early life and education
Choi Jong-hoon was born in Seoul, South Korea on March 7, 1990, according to the solar calendar, and February 6 according to the lunar calendar. He attended the Shindongshin Middle Information Industry High School. During his high school years, he was accepted into the FNC Music talent agency, which later formed the band F.T. Island with Jong-hoon as its leader and guitarist.

Choi attended University of Suwon, majoring in digital music alongside former band member Oh Won Bin.

Career

Music career

In January 2009, members Choi Jong-hoon, Choi Minhwan, and Lee Jaejin were put into the sub group "A3". This group debuted at the 2009 New Year concert "My First Dream" held at the JCB Hall in Tokyo, Japan on January 2, 2009. Choi performed as the guitarist and a sub-vocalist. The group's name was "A3" due to each of the three members having type A blood. This group was formed to help take up some singing time during their concerts, so that lead singer, Lee Hong-gi, would not overstrain his voice.

In 2019, Choi's agency announced that he will be leaving F.T. Island and retiring from the entertainment industry.

Television and acting
Choi began making cameos and guest appearances on many television series starting in 2008. Together with Song Seung-hyun, he starred in Style Wave in December 2009 and January 2010. In this show, stars discuss major style trends and dress a shopper according to a chosen style theme.

Choi participated in episode 15 of Seoul Broadcasting System's Idol Maknae Rebellion with fellow band member Seung-hyun, who was a cast member of the show; the episode aired on February 15, 2010. He made his acting debut as a supporting character in the film You're My Pet (2011) starring actors Jang Keun-suk and Kim Ha-neul. Based on the Japanese manga Tramps Like Us, Choi plays the younger brother of Kim's character. The film centers around a woman living with her human pet.

In December 2012, Choi joined the second season of tvN's The Romantic & Idol.

Choi was cast as the lead character Park Shi-hyun in the web drama Prince's Prince (2015). Seo Yu-na of girl group AOA, who plays his onscreen younger sister Yu-na, Lim Yoon-ho as Lee Mong-ryong, also played co-leads. Based on the webtoon of the same name, the series revolves around Shi-hyun's sister and her immersion into video games. As a first-time lead role, Choi remarked during a press conference prior to filming, "I previously did a bit of acting, but I should carefully and cautiously undertake this role". He also starred in the drama Heroes and Unexpected Heroes (2017).

Other activities
With fellow band member Song Seung-hyun, Choi modeled at the 2009 Autumn Seoul Fashion Week on October 17, 2009 for Lee Ju Young, the designer of the "Resurrection" collection. On June 29, 2009, he was featured with Core Contents Media's soloist Hong Jin Young as one of the main characters in her music video "Love Battery". In August, he participated in episode 19 of MNet Scandal.

Controversies

Allegations and departure
In March 2019, Choi was revealed to be a member of an online group chat that shared sexually explicit videos of women filmed without their knowledge or consent, together with celebrities Lee Jong-hyun and Jung Joon-young. He was also reported to have bribed the police in order to prevent newspapers from covering a drunk driving incident he was involved in 2016. Subsequently, his agency announced that he will be leaving F.T. Island and retiring from the entertainment industry.

In April 2019, police booked Choi for illegally filming women without their consent, distributing a total of six videos, and bribery to cover up his drunk-driving incident. On April 11, 2019, Choi admitted to spreading hidden camera photos taken without consent and also filming illegal hidden camera footage. He was charged with one count of sharing personally taken illegal footage and five counts of sharing footage from other sources.

Sentence to prison
On April 19, 2019, a woman came forward to SBS funE, claiming that five men including Choi, had raped her after she was intoxicated in March 2016, and then shared the footage in a group chat. Choi denied the allegation, but admitted that he and the woman were together on that day. On May 10, 2019, Choi was arrested on the gang rape allegations and was indicted on charge of taking part in a gang rape in 2016. On November 29, 2019, Choi was sentenced to five years in prison. On May 12, 2020, Seoul High Court reduced his sentence from five years to two and half years after reaching an agreement with one of the victims.
On November 8, 2021, it was reported that Choi was released from prison.

Filmography

Television series

Film

Music video appearances

Discography

Guest appearances

References

External links

 
 
 

1990 births
Living people
People from Seoul
Singers from Seoul
Male actors from Seoul
FNC Entertainment artists
South Korean keyboardists
South Korean male idols
South Korean pop rock singers
F.T. Island members
South Korean rock guitarists
South Korean people convicted of rape